506th may refer to:

506th Air Expeditionary Group, provisional United States Air Force unit
506th Air Refueling Squadron, inactive United States Air Force unit
506th Airborne Infantry Regiment Association, charitable veterans' organization
506th Bombardment Squadron, inactive United States Air Force unit
506th Fighter Squadron, unit of the Oklahoma Air National Guard that flies the KC-135 Stratotanker
506th Infantry Regiment (United States), unit assigned to the 4th Brigade Combat Team (BCT) of the 101st Airborne Division

See also
506 (number)
506, the year 506 (DVI) of the Julian calendar
506 BC
E Company, 506th Infantry Regiment (United States), one of the best-known companies in the United States Army